Blaž "Baka" Slišković (born 30 May 1959) is a Bosnian professional football manager and former player. He is regarded as one of the most successful Bosnian football managers.

As a player, Slišković was capped 26 times for Yugoslavia in the late 1970s and early 1980s. After retiring from playing, he became a successful manager. In July 2011, French football manager and former player, Zinedine Zidane, named Slišković as one of his idols while growing up and included him in his "All Time Best 11" of Marseille.

Club career
During his playing days, Slišković was considered one of the most technically gifted players of his generation. In 1985, he was named the Yugoslav Footballer of the Year. He had the most success while playing for hometown club Velež Mostar and Croatian club Hajduk Split. With Velež, Slišković won the 1980–81 Yugoslav Cup and the 1980–81 Balkans Cup, while with Hajduk he won the 1983–84 Yugoslav Cup and was also part of the Hajduk team that made it all the way to the semi-finals of the 1983–84 UEFA Cup.

Slišković was most famous while playing for French Ligue 1 club Marseille. After Marseille, Slišković played in Italy with Pescara, before returning to France and playing for Lens, Mulhouse and Rennes. In 1992, he returned to Italy and came back to Pescara. In 1993, Slišković left Italy and joined Croatian club Hrvatski Dragovoljac, where he stayed until 1995. Finally, in 1996 he joined Bosnian club Zrinjski Mostar, where he eventually finished his career in 1997 at the age of 38.

In 2011, for the 100th anniversary of Hajduk Split, Slišković was chosen in the "Hajduk Split Best 11 of all-time".

International career
Although most experts expected Slišković to make a great international career, he was only capped 26 times for Yugoslavia. He scored three goals in the process. Slišković was prevented from playing in the 1982 FIFA World Cup due to an injury, sustained in the second half during a 1981–82 Yugoslav First League match between OFK Beograd and Hajduk Split. He then lost his place in the UEFA Euro 1984 Yugoslav squad after, allegedly, a Yugoslav-printed newspaper journalist quoted Slišković incorrectly after an interview after a friendly game between Yugoslavia and Switzerland (0–2) and caused the national team head coach, Todor Veselinović, to drop him from the squad. His final international was a November 1986 European Championship qualification match away against England.

Slišković began to play for the Bosnia and Herzegovina national team after the breakup of Yugoslavia in the early 1990s. He played three unofficial friendly games for Bosnia and Herzegovina in 1993 as the captain in all three games.

Managerial career
Right after ending his playing career, Slišković became the new manager of Hrvatski Dragovoljac in 1997. He managed Dragovoljac until 1998, after which he joined Zrinjski Mostar. In January 1999, Slišković joined Brotnjo and won the Herzeg-Bosnia Cup with the club in May of that same year.

In the winter of 2000, he left Brotnjo and became an assistant manager to Mišo Smajlović in the Bosnia and Herzegovina national team. Slišković became the head coach of the national team in March 2002, after Smajlović left the team because of his contract expiring. Slišković stayed as the head coach until 2006. In 2004, he won the award "Best Bosnia and Herzegovina Coach" by Dnevni avaz and the "Bosnia and Herzegovina Man of the Year" also in 2004. While Bosnia and Herzegovina head coach, on 24 August 2004, Slišković replaced Ivan Katalinić and simultaneously became the new Hajduk Split manager. On 10 April 2005, he got sacked at Hajduk.

From 2005 until 2007, Slišković once again managed Zrinjski Mostar, making decent results. By the summer of 2008, he was appointed manager of Albanian Superliga club Tirana, but shortly after left the club in December of that year. In March 2010, Romanian club Unirea Alba Iulia hired Slišković until the end of the season, replacing Adrian Falub. In April 2011, he again came back to Bosnia and Herzegovina taking the manager position at Bosnian Premier League club Široki Brijeg, reaching the fourth position in the 2010–11 Bosnian Premier League season and qualifying for the 2011–12 UEFA Europa League first qualifying round.

On 19 January 2012, Chinese Super League side Qingdao Jonoon announced that they signed a contract with Slišković to replace South Korean manager Chang Woe-ryong. From April to June 2015, he once again managed Široki Brijeg.

In March 2017, Slišković again took the manager position at Zrinjski Mostar for the third time in his career, eventually leading the team to win the Bosnian Premier League in the 2016–17 season. In the 2017–18 season, he won his second league title in a row with Zrinjski. After winning two league trophies, Slišković left Zrinjski in June 2018. However, after the sacking of new manager Ante Miše, the club asked Slišković to return, which he agreed to on 13 August 2018. After the end of the 2018–19 Bosnian Premier League season, it was announced on 7 June 2019 that Slišković did not come to an agreement with the board of directors of Zrinjski on a contract extension and that he was leaving the club.

Shortly after leaving Zrinjski, on 3 July 2019, Slišković became the new manager of Hong Kong Premier League club Kitchee, signing a two-year contract. On 23 March 2020, he stepped down and transitioned to a consultancy role with the club.

After Amar Osim got sacked as manager by Bosnian Premier League club Željezničar on 11 April 2021 due to poor results, three days later, on 14 April, Slišković was named as its new manager. In his first game as manager, Željezničar drew against Radnik Bijeljina on 18 April 2021. Slišković oversaw his first loss as Željezničar manager on 25 April 2021, in a league game against Olimpik. In his first ever Sarajevo derby, Slišković's Željezničar lost against FK Sarajevo away in a league match on 1 May 2021. Slišković left Željezničar after his contract with the club expired in June 2021.

Personal life
Slišković was born in Mostar, FPR Yugoslavia, present day Bosnia and Herzegovina, on 30 May 1959 to Bosnian Croat parents. He was married to Bosnian Serb handball player Svetlana Kitić. Slišković's father Vladko played for Velež Mostar for 15 years. Blaž's son Vladimir is also a professional football manager, most recently managing China League Two club Hunan Billows in 2017.

Career statistics

International goals
Scores and results list Yugoslavia's goal tally first, score column indicates score after each Sušić goal.

Managerial statistics

Honours

Player
Velež Mostar
Yugoslav Cup: 1980–81
Balkans Cup: 1980–81

Hajduk Split
Yugoslav Cup: 1983–84

Yugoslavia U21 
UEFA Euro U-21 Championship: 1978

Yugoslavia
Mediterranean Games: 1979

Individual
Yugoslav Footballer of the Year: 1985
Hajduk Split all-time first 11: 2011

Manager
Brotnjo
Herzeg-Bosnia Cup: 1998–99

Zrinjski Mostar
Bosnian Premier League: 2016–17, 2017–18

Individual 
Bosnia and Herzegovina Manager of the Year: 2003, 2018
Bosnia and Herzegovina Man of the Year: 2004
Bosnian Premier League Manager of the Season: 2017–18
Best Bosnia and Herzegovina Coach by Dnevni avaz: 2004

References

External links

Blaž Slišković at Soccerway

1959 births
Living people
Sportspeople from Mostar
Croats of Bosnia and Herzegovina
Association football midfielders
Yugoslav footballers
Yugoslavia international footballers
Mediterranean Games gold medalists for Yugoslavia
Competitors at the 1979 Mediterranean Games
Mediterranean Games medalists in football
Bosnia and Herzegovina footballers
FK Velež Mostar players
HNK Hajduk Split players
Olympique de Marseille players
Delfino Pescara 1936 players
RC Lens players
FC Mulhouse players
Stade Rennais F.C. players
NK Hrvatski Dragovoljac players
HŠK Zrinjski Mostar players
Yugoslav First League players
Ligue 1 players
Serie A players
Croatian Football League players
Yugoslav expatriate footballers
Expatriate footballers in France
Yugoslav expatriate sportspeople in France
Expatriate footballers in Italy
Yugoslav expatriate sportspeople in Italy
Bosnia and Herzegovina expatriate footballers
Expatriate footballers in Croatia
Bosnia and Herzegovina expatriate sportspeople in Croatia
Bosnia and Herzegovina football managers
NK Hrvatski Dragovoljac managers
HŠK Zrinjski managers
NK Brotnjo managers
Bosnia and Herzegovina national football team managers
HNK Hajduk Split managers
KF Tirana managers
CSM Unirea Alba Iulia managers
NK Široki Brijeg managers
Al-Ansar F.C. managers
Qingdao Hainiu F.C. (1990) managers
Kitchee SC managers
FK Željezničar Sarajevo managers
Kategoria Superiore managers
Premier League of Bosnia and Herzegovina managers
Bosnia and Herzegovina expatriate football managers
Expatriate football managers in Croatia
Expatriate football managers in Albania
Bosnia and Herzegovina expatriate sportspeople in Albania
Expatriate football managers in Romania
Bosnia and Herzegovina expatriate sportspeople in Romania
Expatriate football managers in Saudi Arabia
Bosnia and Herzegovina expatriate sportspeople in Saudi Arabia
Expatriate football managers in China
Bosnia and Herzegovina expatriate sportspeople in China
Expatriate football managers in Hong Kong
Bosnia and Herzegovina expatriate sportspeople in Hong Kong